Lalremsanga Fanai (born 30 September 2001) is an Indian professional footballer who plays as a forward for Rajasthan United in the I-League.

Career
Lalremsanga was the top scorer of 2017-18 Mizoram Premier League, he is product of Aizawl F.C. Academy and played a vital role in Aizawl FC's achievement in the 2017–18 Youth League U18, he was also part of the National Under-17 probable squad for the 2017 FIFA U-17 World Cup. He was promoted to senior squad for 2018–19 season.

He made his professional debut for the Aizawl against Shillong Lajong F.C. on 28 October 2018. He started and played full match as Aizawl lost 2–1.

Career statistics

Club

References

2001 births
Living people
People from Mamit district
Indian footballers
Aizawl FC players
Footballers from Mizoram
I-League players
Association football forwards
Rajasthan United FC players